Embla Ester Lovisa Granqvist Hjulström (born 5 July 1994) is a Swedish actress. She is best known for her role as Greta in Svensson, Svensson and Simone Bernér in several Beck-films.

Filmography
2007–2008 – Svensson, Svensson
Beck – I Guds namn (2007)
Beck – Gamen (2007)
Beck – Advokaten (2006)
Kidz in da Hood (2006)
Beck – Skarpt läge (2006)
Lite som du (2005)
Min sista vilja (2005)
Four Shades of Brown (2004)
Syskonsalt (2000)

References

1994 births
Swedish film actresses
Living people